Heinz Rudolf Pagels (February 19, 1939 – July 23, 1988) was an American physicist, an associate professor of physics at Rockefeller University, the executive director and chief executive officer of the New York Academy of Sciences, and president of the International League for Human Rights. He wrote the popular science books The Cosmic Code (1982), Perfect Symmetry (1985), and The Dreams of Reason: The Computer and the Rise of the Sciences of Complexity (1988).

Early life
Pagels was a 1956 graduate of Woodberry Forest School in Virginia. The school awards The Heinz R. Pagels Jr. Physics Memorial Award each year to a graduating student who has demonstrated outstanding achievement in physics.

Career
Pagels obtained his PhD in elementary particle physics from Stanford University under the guidance of Sidney Drell. His technical work included the Physics Reports review articles Quantum Chromodynamics (with W.Marciano) and "Departures from Chiral Symmetry". A number of his published papers dealt with the source of the mass of elementary particles in quantum field theory, especially the Nambu–Goldstone realization of chiral symmetry breaking. He also published (with David Atkatz) a visionary paper entitled "Origin of the Universe as a quantum tunneling event" (1982) that prefigured later work done in the field. The list of his graduate students includes Dan Caldi, Saul Stokar and Seth Lloyd.

Personal life
Pagels was an outspoken critic of those he believed misrepresented the discoveries and ideas of science to promote mysticism and pseudoscience. In his capacity as executive director of the New York Academy of Science in 1986, Pagels submitted an affidavit in a case involving a former member of the Transcendental Meditation movement who had sued the organization for fraud.

As president of the International League for Human Rights, Pagels worked to support freedom for researchers in other countries. He was a fellow of the New York Institute of the Humanities at New York University, a member of the Council on Foreign Relations, a member of the Science and Law Committee of the New York Bar Association, and a trustee of the New York Hall of Science.

In 1969, Pagels married Elaine Hiesey, later, a theology professor, author, and MacArthur Fellow. Their son Mark died in 1987 after a four-year illness. The couple had an adopted daughter Sarah and an adopted son David.

Heinz Pagels died in 1988 in a mountain climbing accident on Pyramid Peak, a 14,000-foot summit 10 miles to the southwest of the Aspen Center for Physics, where he spent his summers. Many writers of his obituary quote a dream he wrote about in his book The Cosmic Code:

Legacy

In popular culture
Pagels' work in chaos theory provided the inspiration for the character of Ian Malcolm in Michael Crichton's novel Jurassic Park.

Popular non-fiction
Pagels had a gift for explaining complex topics in easy to understand terms, avoiding both oversimplification and needless technicalities. The cosmologist David Schramm described Pagels' 1982 book The Cosmic Code as "a beautiful account of modern physics". In reviewing Pagels' 1985 book Perfect Symmetry, Schramm wrote: "Heinz Pagels is one of less than a handful of active scientists who can write excellent prose about the scientific frontier for a general audience."

In a review of Pagel's book The Dreams of Reason by New Scientist the physicist John D. Barrow wrote : This is a difficult book to summarise because it bears many of the marks of an attempted synthesis of all the author’s thoughts on a wide spectrum of subjects that do not naturally come together into a seamless whole. Nonetheless, it contains much that is worth reading and pondering. Francisco Goya wrote ‘The dreams of reason bring forth monsters’, the words that inspire its title. But it shouldn’t give you nightmares. It is not an exposition of
science. It is not a work of philosophy nor is it an autobiography. But these are three good reasons for reading it.

Scientific awards
In 1986, the Committee on Human Rights of Scientists renamed its annual award as the Heinz R. Pagels Human Rights of Scientists Award.

Works

References

External links

 bio: Heinz R Pagels at Edge Foundation, Inc.
 Jeremy Bernstein. Memories of Heinz Pagels
  (via: Cosma Shalizi)

1939 births
1988 deaths
20th-century American physicists
Mountaineering deaths
Princeton University alumni
Woodberry Forest School alumni